Yokogawa Musashino Atlastars is a Japanese rugby union team based in Musashino, Tokyo.
They won promotion to the Top League for one season in 2008–09 being relegated that same season.

History 
The team was founded as Yokogawa Denki in 1946.

Squad

Former players and coaches 
Yoshihito Yoshida - former Japan wing
Daisuke Mori - wing three-quarter back
Radike Samo - Australian back-row
Fa'atonu Fili Signed on 2 year deal with option of 3rd

External links 
Official Site

Japanese rugby union teams
Rugby clubs established in 1946
Rugby in Kantō
1946 establishments in Japan